Domingues is a Portuguese surname. Its Spanish variant is Domínguez. Notable people with the surname include:

 Adauto Domingues (born 1961), Brazilian middle-distance runner
 Adelina Domingues (1888–2002), American supercentenarian
 Altino Domingues (born 1951), Portuguese-American football player
 Amy Domingues, cellist and viola da gamba player
 João Domingues (born 1993), Portuguese tennis player 
 Leandro Domingues (born 1983), Brazilian footballer 
 Maurício Rodrigues Alves Domingues (born 1978), Brazilian football player
 Rachel Domingues (born 2006), Canadian-Portuguese actor
 Renan Cardoso Domingues (born 1988), Brazilian football player

See also
 Domingues (born 1983), Mozambican footballer